Eve Mumewa Doreen Fesl  is an academic in sociolinguistic policy and implementation and the first Indigenous Australian to receive a PhD from an Australian university in 1989. She is a member of both the Gubbi Gubbi (through her mother) and Gungulu (through her father) nations.

She lectures at the Queensland University of Technology's Oodgeroo Unit.

Early life and education
Evelyn Serico was the first child of Maurice and Evelyn Reen (née Monkland-Olsen) Serico. Evelyn Reen was a Gubbi Gubbi person, while Maurice was of the Gungulu nation. She has a younger brother. Her mother was forcibly removed to the Barambah Aboriginal Reserve (now called Cherbourg) under the Aboriginals Protection Act, and she grew up on the reserve. An Englishman who brought books to the reserve inspired her mother to give her children a good education, so she moved her family to Brisbane for that reason.

After moving to Brisbane, Fesl encountered racism at Ashgrove State School. She took up athletics to demonstrate that she could beat one of her classmates. She later learnt German and topped the state in her year of HSC but failed English. Her German score allowed her to study linguistics at Monash University. She later completed honours in anthropology, graduate diploma in international law and finally a PhD in 1989, documenting her mother's native Gubbi Gubbi language.

Sporting career
Fesl is a former champion discus thrower of Victoria and Queensland, In her youth, she was a versatile track and field athlete, competing in running, throwing and jumping events. She competed for Kelvin Grove in Queensland athletics. She moved to Melbourne in 1956 in an attempt to get into the Australian Olympic team.

Recognition and honours
Fesl was awarded "Scholar of the Year" in the 1986 NAIDOC Awards. Fesl was awarded a Member of the Order of Australia in the 1988 Australia Day Honours and a Centenary Medal in 2001.

Following her mother's death in 2005, Fesl became the senior spokesperson for the Gubbi Gubbi people.

In December 2016, she was awarded a United Nations Association of Australia award, for "community work and past achievements".

References

Living people
Recipients of the Centenary Medal
Members of the Order of Australia
Year of birth missing (living people)
Monash University alumni
Kabi_Kabi